Frank Turner Simes is an American musician, singer, guitarist, songwriter, composer and record producer. Simes is the musical director for Roger Daltrey, and has recorded and performed with Mick Jagger, Don Henley, and Stevie Nicks.

Early life
Born in Tokyo as a US citizen, Frank Simes began studying guitar at the age of ten. The second and younger son of Stephen Hardy Simes, legal attaché to General Douglas MacArthur and judge advocate at US Army Japan, and Japanese model and restaurateur, Sachiko Nakamura. His early interests also included close-up magic and fine arts, which remain lifelong passions. His professional career began at 14 when his band, Sunrise, which he formed with Mickie Yoshino and Steve Fox, later of Godiego released a record on RCA Victor. The following year he moved to Los Angeles to study music at Fairfax High School. When Simes was 16 he began attending college as a music major. At 20, his band, the Whizz Kidds, was signed by Highland/A&M Records, and Frank's song, "Sweet Honey", their debut single, received national airplay.

Music career
Simes continued his music career, working with Martha Davis of The Motels as a songwriter, producer, and guitarist for three years in the mid-1980s. In 1989, he began touring with Don Henley as a guitarist, and vocalist and soon after as a songwriter when Simes co-wrote "Workin' It" and "Goodbye to a River".  Simes was featured on the Inside Job DVD and continues to work with Henley today.

Simes toured and recorded with Mick Jagger on his Wandering Spirit album and tour, was the band leader for Don Henley on the Inside Job tour, and played guitar and sang for Stevie Nicks on the Enchanted tour.  During the next two decades, Simes also worked with Rod Stewart, Don Felder, Charlotte Church, Sylvie Vartan, Engelbert Humperdinck, David Lee Roth, Warren Zevon and Roger Waters. Simes played on Roger Daltrey's album Moonlighting and appeared in The Who's documentary Amazing Journey.  Simes was named musical director for Roger Daltrey's band No Plan B.

Since 1993, Simes has composed over 1,400 pieces of music for such companies as Paramount Television and Los Angeles Post Music. Simes has also composed original guitar and piano pieces in the Modern, Baroque, and Romantic styles, some of which were recorded by the London Philharmonic Orchestra.

Simes produced several albums for major labels such as Sony Music Entertainment, RCA Records, Epic Records and Mitsubishi. Frank Simes is the recipient of nine platinum records with such artist as Don Henley, Rod Stewart and various soundtrack albums. His credits include producing three albums on Sony, recording with Rod Stewart on his album entitled, As Time Goes By: the Great American Songbook, Volume II, performing on Roger Daltrey's Moonlighting anthology CD and DVD, and Daltrey's Gold CD, as well as on Engelbert Humperdinck's The Winding Road album and Greatest Hits and More. Simes also recorded with Art Garfunkel on Some Enchanted Evening, Mylène Farmer on her Innamoramento album, and with Sylvie Vartan on her album Nouvelle Vague.  He has produced five albums for vocalist Ann Lewis.

Simes composed and recorded a musical entitled The Door with partner Lisa Verlo. Together they formed Soundlove Productions, collaborating on a children's CD, Turner's Treehouse, as well as music for TV and film.

In 2009, Simes toured as lead guitarist and musical director in Roger Daltrey's No Plan B band for the Use It or Lose It tour. The band also opened for Eric Clapton on two tours in 2010. In 2011, continuing as musical director and lead guitarist for Roger Daltrey, Simes performed the rock opera Tommy and other songs at a warm-up show in Bournemouth at the O2 Academy in preparation for a show at the Royal Albert Hall to benefit Teenage Cancer Trust. Simes performed alongside Pete Townshend who played and sang as a guest at the TCT show. In July 2011, Roger Daltrey and band toured England, Scotland, Ireland, Belgium, and Denmark, performing the legendary rock opera Tommy, The Who classics, and Roger's solo works. Roger and band also toured in the US and Canada beginning September 2011. Additional dates in Europe, Australia and Japan were booked for 2012.

On 18 July 2012, The Who announced Simes as musical director and on keyboards/backing vocals for a 35-date tour where they played their album Quadrophenia in its entirety.

In November 2014, The Who started their 50th-anniversary world tour, The Who Hits 50! with Simes as musical director and playing keyboards, mandolin, banjo, percussion, and backing vocals.

Awards

 Double Grammy nominee with Don Henley – 2000
 Platinum Album, Inside Job CD  – Don Henley, Warner Bros.
 Platinum Album, Inside Job DVD  – Don Henley, Warner Bros.
 Platinum Album, Actual Miles – Don Henley, Geffen
 Platinum Album, As Time Goes By: the Great American Songbook, Volume II – Rod Stewart, Jay Records
 Platinum Album, Your Filthy Little Mouth CD  – David Lee Roth, Warner Bros.
 Platinum Album, Wandering Spirit – Mick Jagger, Atlantic
 Platinum Album, Leap of Faith Soundtrack – Don Henley
 Platinum Album, Tell Me The Truth – Timothy B. Schmit, MCA
 Platinum Album, Michael Soundtrack – Various Artists, Revolution
 Platinum Album, Kermit Unpigged – The Muppets Jim Henson
 Platinum Album, SoloSolo – Puffy, Epic/Sony

Songs

 "Pink Christmas", Pink Christmas, Victor – 2007 
 "Battlefield", Rebirth, Ann Lewis, Sony Jpn – 2006
 "Truth or Lies", Rebirth, Ann Lewis, Sony Jpn– 2006
 "Garasu no Tenshi" ["The Prince of Glass"], Rebirth, Ann Lewis, Sony Jpn– 2006
 "Helpless Abuse", Me, Myself, Ann I, Ann Lewis, Mitsubishi – 2004
 "Loneliness", Me, Myself, Ann I, Ann Lewis, Mitsubishi – 2004
 "Jinsei Wa Jeopardy" ["Life is Jeopardy"], Me, Myself, and I, Ann Lewis, Mitsubishi – 2004
 "Sakura and Rose" ["Cherry Blossom and Rose"], Girls' Night Out, Ann Lewis, Sony Jpn – 2002
 "Genshi-Bakudan" ["Atom Bomb"], Girls' Night Out, Ann Lewis, Sony Jpn – 2002
 "Girls' Night Out", Girls' Night Out, Ann Lewis, Sony Jpn – 2002
 "Workin' It", Inside Job, Warner Bros. – co-wrote with Don Henley – 2000
 "Goodbye to a River", Inside Job, Warner Bros. – co-wrote with Don Henley – 2000
 "Opus 5 in B minor" – London Philharmonic Orchestra – 1999
 "Snacks", SoloSolo, Epic – Puffy
 "I Imagined You", Surreal McCoys, Sony Jpn – 1997
 "A Thousand Miles Away", Surreal McCoys, Sony  – 1997
 "So Disappointed", Surreal McCoys, Sony  –  1997
 "The One that Got Away", Surreal McCoys, Sony  – 1997
 "Trip of No Return", Surreal McCoys, Sony  – 1997
 "What Kind of Life", Surreal McCoys, Sony – 1997
 "No One", Surreal McCoys, Sony – 1997
 "Life's a Rocket", Surreal McCoys, Sony – 1997
 "Don't Be Late", Surreal McCoys, Sony – 1997
 "The One Sure Thing on Mars", Surreal McCoys, Sony – 1997
 "Everybody's Got the Monkey", David Lee Roth, Warner Bros. – 1995
 "Young Man", Slave to the Thrill, Hurricane, Enigma – 1988
 "Slave to the Thrill", Slave to the Thrill, Hurricane, Enigma – 1988
 "Get Your Hooks Off Me", The Whizz Kidds, LA Freeway, Compilation – 1979
 "Sweet Honey", The Whizz Kidds, A&M/Highland – 1977

Recordings

 The Best of the British – Engelbert Humperdinck
 Sylvie Vertan – Sylvie Vertan
 Wandering Spirit – Mick Jagger, Atlantic
 As Time Goes By: the Great American Songbook, Volume II – Rod Stewart, Jay Records
 Girls In Black – Don Felder, Rocket Science
 "Don't Rock The Boat" – Don Henley, Leap of Faith Soundtrack
 Come Rain Come Shine – Don Henley, Warner Bros.
 It's Not Easy Being Green – Don Henley, BMG
 Some Enchanted Evening – Art Garfunkel
 Cruel Obsession – David Lee Roth, Atlantic
 Tell Me The Truth – Timothy B. Schmit, MCA
 Pink Christmas – Ann Lewis, Victor
 Bleu – Ann Lewis, Victor
 Boys Get Ready –  Ann Lewis, Victor
 The Conqueror –  Ann Lewis, Victor
 Girls Night Out –  Ann Lewis, Victor
 Last Action Hero –  Michael Kaman's Score
 SoloSolo – Puffy, Epic/Sony

Musical director
 The Who – 2012 Olympics
 The Who – Quadrophenia tour, 2012–2013
 The Who – The Who Hits 50! tour, 2014–2016
 Keith Moon: The Real Me – musical, Mick Berry, 2015
 Roger Daltrey – Tommy tour, 2011
 Roger Daltrey – 2006 to present
 Don Felder – 2005 to present
 Don Henley – Inside Job, tour and video, 1999 to present
 Stevie Nicks – Enchanted tour, 1998
 Heartbeat of a Planet – TV show, 2013
 The Door – musical, 2012

DVD and film
"The Who Quadrophenia Live in London" – The Who
"Inside Job" – Don Henley
"The How" – Roger Daltrey
"Amazing Journey: The Story of The Who" – interviewed in the documentary
"VH1 Storytellers" – Don Henley
"VH1 Storytellers" – Stevie Nicks
"MTV Unplugged" – Don Henley

Television appearances

 "The Tonight Show Starring Jimmy Fallon" – with The Who
 "The Ellen DeGeneres Show" – with Roger Daltrey
 "The Tonight Show with Jay Leno" – with Don Henley
 "The Conan O'Brien Show" – with Don Henley
 "Taking You Home" – music video with Don Henley
 "MTV Unplugged" Stevie Nicks
 "Storytellers", Stevie Nicks
 "Saturday Night Live" with Mick Jagger
 "Saturday Night Live" with Don Henley (1989)
 "Saturday Night Live" with Don Henley (2000)
 "Last Worthless Evening" – music video with Don Henley
 "Don't Tear Me Up" music video with Mick Jagger
 "Live In New York" with Mick Jagger
 "Late Night with David Letterman" with Don Henley
 "MTV Unplugged" with Don Henley
 "Stoytellers" with Don Henley
 "MTV Awards Presentation" with Don Henley
 "Rosie O'Donnell" with Stevie Nicks
 "Solid Gold" with Martha Davis
 "The Arsenio Hall Show" with Peter Cetera
 "Top Of The Pops" with Martha Davis

TV and film composing
Simes is composer of over 1,200 musical pieces. His works have appeared in TV shows and films including:

 Cell, Stephen King, starring John Cusack
 The Sopranos, HBO
 Friends, NBC
 Sex and the City, HBO
 20/20, ABC
 Mad About You, NBC
 Drew Carey Show, ABC
 King of the Hill, FOX
 Entertainment Tonight, Syndicated
 Nightline, ABC
 General Hospital, ABC
 One Life to Live, ABC
 Nash Bridges, CBS
 World News Now, ABC
 Primetime Live, ABC
 Jerry Springer, Syndicated
 Roseanne, ABC
 Hudson Street, ABC
 Beach Patrol, Local
 Hangin' With You, ABC
 Step By Step, ABC
 Maury Povich, NBC
 Wheel Of Fortune, Syndicated
 Good Morning America, ABC
 Saturday World News, ABC
 Extra, Syndicated
 Reboot, ABC
 Bugs Bunny and Tweetie Bird, ABC
 Buffy The Vampire Slayer, UPN
 Saved by the Bell, NBC
 TV's Funniest Families, NBC
 Mike And Maty, ABC
 Bad As I Wanna Be: The Dennis Rodman Story, USA
 Gordon Elliott Show, Syndicated
 Game Warden Wildlife Journal, DSC
 Martha Stewart Living, TLC
 Ripley's Believe It Or Not, TBS
 Professional Bowling, ABC
 What-A-Mess, ABC
 Rebecca's Garden, Local
 Caryl & Marilyn: Real Friends, ABC
 In Search Of History, A&E
 The Ricki Lake Show, Syndicated
 Bump in the Night, ABC
 In Person With Ma, NBC
 The Fresh Prince Of Bel-Air, NBC
 Jenny Jones
 Living Better With Carrie Wait
 Thursday Night Movie, ABC
 Good Morning America, ABC
 Shipmates
 Worst Witch
 Young Comedians
 The Tracey Ullman Show
 Rock 'n Roll High
 Paula Poundstone
 Extreme Comedy, ABC
 Winnie The Pooh, ABC
 Pee Wee Herman, NBC
 Ed, ABC
 Golf, The Memorial, ABC
 Speedway Survival
 Sniper School
 Name Your Adventure, NBC
 George Carlin, Promo

TV commercials
 Colgate – 2015
 Honda – 2014
 Beneful – 2014
 Blue Cross – 2013
 Burger King – 2013

References

External links
 Official Who website – Frank Simes Musical Director, keyboards/backing vocals
 Official Who website – Frank Simes on tour with Roger Daltrey
 Frank Simes – Artistdirect.com
 
 Official Frank Simes blog 
 THE DOOR a musical 
 
 Gary Graff (2009) Roger Daltrey plots rare North American solo tour 
Frank Simes Interview – NAMM Oral History Library (2016)

1956 births
Living people
Fairfax High School (Los Angeles) alumni
American rock singers
American record producers
American multi-instrumentalists
American film score composers
American television composers
No Plan B (band) members